Qatar – United Kingdom relations are the bilateral relations between the State of Qatar and the United Kingdom of Great Britain and Northern Ireland, covering a wide range of issues and activities of mutual interest.

History

In 1868, British Lieutenant General and East India Company officer Sir Lewis Pelly arrived in Bahrain to protect British interests through the enforcement of the earlier Perpetual Maritime Truce of 1853 following a number of raids by members of the tribes in the region. Pelly believed these raids had been orchestrated by the ruler of Bahrain and he resolved the situation by insisting that the rulers of Qatar, Bahrain and Abu Dhabi sign declarations to affirm their commitment to the truce. The Qatari declaration, which was signed by Mohammed bin Thani, principal ruler of the Qatari tribes, was the first recognition of Qatar as independent from Bahrain. Ultimately this treaty became the starting point for the British government’s recognition of Qatar as an independent sovereign state.

The Ottomans officially renounced sovereignty over Qatar in 1913. The new ruler Abdullah bin Jassim Al Thani signed a treaty with Britain in 1916, thereby instating the area under the trucial system. This meant that Qatar relinquished its autonomy in foreign affairs, such as the power to cede territory, and other affairs, in exchange for Britain's military protection from external threats.

Initially, the British were reluctant to involve themselves in inland affairs. However, when oil was discovered in the area in the 1930s, the race for oil concessions intensified. In 1938, the Anglo-Persian Oil Company began drilling its first well in Dukhan and a year later, the well-struck oil.

Diplomatic representation
Bilateral relations between the two countries have expanded since the opening of the British embassy in Doha in 1949, marked by the arrival of British Political Officer John Wilton. The embassy’s mandate is to develop and maintain relations between the United Kingdom and Qatar, dealing with a range of political, commercial, security and economic questions of interest to both countries. The current UK ambassador to Qatar is Jon Wilks CMG.

Qatar has had an embassy in London since 1970, based in Mayfair. The current Qatari ambassador to the UK is Fahad Mohammed Al-Attiyah.

Diplomatic visits

UK Prime Minister David Cameron visited Qatar in 2011, and the then Emir of Qatar made a 3-day state visit in October 2010.

The current Emir of Qatar made a state visit to the UK in October 2014.

In March 2013, Prince Charles and his wife the Duchess of Cornwall, arrived in Qatar for a state visit.

On 20 September 2019, British Prime Minister Boris Johnson hosted Sheikh Tamim bin Hamad Al Thani at the Downing Street. Johnson pressed over the fact that the UK’s relation with Qatar is going from “strength to strength”.

Diplomatic cooperation

Military
During Operation Herrick in Afghanistan and Operation Telic in Iraq, the Royal Air Force stationed forces at Al Udeid Air Base in Qatar. After these forces withdrew, the airbase became home to No. 83 Expeditionary Air Group, the RAF's headquarters for military operations in the Middle East. Since 2014, the airbase has supported Operation Shader, the UK's intervention against ISIS in Iraq and Syria. It has also hosted RAF Boeing RC-135 reconnaissance aircraft in support of this operation.

The UK and Qatar signed a Defence Cooperation Agreement in November 2014.

In February 2014, the Royal Navy warship HMS Monmouth hosted NATO delegates in the port of Doha in Qatar.

Qatari cadets attend the Royal Military Academy Sandhurst each year, and the current Emir of Qatar, Sheikh Tamim bin Hamad Al Thani, is a Sandhurst graduate.

British military also provide officer training to Qatari forces in Qatar.

In 2018, the two countries' air forces formed a joint squadron of Eurofighter Typhoons, named No. 12 Squadron RAF, based at RAF Coningsby in England. It was the UK's first joint squadron since World War II. It became operational in December 2020 and was followed by a second joint squadron consisting of BAE Systems Hawk advanced training jets, in addition to RAF aerial refueling support.

Business and investment

UK Trade and Investment (UKTI) helps UK-based businesses expand in Qatar whilst also aiding Qatari businesses locate and expand in the UK. For example, the Lord Mayor of the City of London Alderman Alan Yarrow visited Qatar on 27 January 2015 to improve professional and financial services ties between the two counties, as well as to establish the new British Chamber of Commerce in Doha (housed in the headquarters of HSBC). Trade and investment between UK and Qatar currently stands at £5 billion per year. The UK is the fourth largest exporter to Qatar.

In March 2013, Qatar and the UK began talks to invest up to £10 billion from Qatar into key infrastructure projects in Britain. Among the specific schemes discussed were the new £14 billion nuclear reactor at Hinkley Point in Somerset planned by EDF Energy. Qatar has also since invested in Heathrow Airport, Canary Wharf, Barclays, Sainsbury’s and Harrods.

Additionally, the Qatar British Business Forum, established in 1992, is a membership organization with over 500 British companies based in Qatar.

British-Dutch oil firm Royal Dutch Shell is the second biggest investor in Qatar after ExxonMobil and has stakes in some of Qatar’s LNG production plants, known as trains.

On 19th October 2021, during UK Global Investment Summit, Qatar Energy and Royal Dutch Shell signed an agreement to work together on UK's blue and green hydrogen projects in order to promote decarbonization and help in achieving the UK's target of net-zero carbon emissions.
 	
The UK government has turned to Qatar to seek a long-term gas deal to ensure a stable supply of liquefied natural gas (LNG) to the UK. Prime Minister Boris Johnson asked the current Emir of Qatar, Sheikh Tamim bin Hamad Al Thani, for help during a meeting at the UN General Assembly in September 2021.

Education

The Qatar Foundation plays an important part in facilitating educational and academic connections; the foundation sponsors Qatari students studying at UK universities, and University College London (UCL) is represented at the Qatar Foundation by UCL Qatar, a branch campus partner of Hamad bin Khalifa University.
On a recent official visit to Qatar, the UK’s Minister for Universities and Science, Dr David Willetts MP, spent much time at the foundation, where he highlighted the depth and importance of collaboration between UK institutions and Qatar Foundation.

There are also amicable links between the Centre for Gulf Studies at Qatar University and Cambridge University.

Science, technology and medicine

In 2013, the UK set up the UK Science and Innovation Network (SIN) in the Gulf, based in Doha, to support science and innovation partnering in the six countries of the Gulf Cooperation Council. This is in line with Qatar’s plans to spend 2.8% of its national budget annually on research and to invest heavily in infrastructure and programmes to build a knowledge economy.

Some of the two countries’ collaborations in these fields include:

 Shell Oil / QatarEnergy / Imperial College London - Carbonates and Carbon Storage Centre: This is Imperial College London’s largest overseas research investment based in London and based around carbon storage.
 Imperial College London / Hamad Medical Corporation - Qatar Biobank: This project aims to map health indicators of 20% of the Qatari and long-term resident population. 
 Imperial College London / Qatar Foundation - Qatar Robotics Surgery Centre: This training and software development centre researches into robotic surgery.
 Magdi Yacoub Heart Foundation / Qatar Foundation: Qatar Cardiovascular Research Centre: This is set to become a regional centre for cardiovascular research. 
 The Qatar Foundation / British Library - Qatar Digital Library: This project will digitize, annotate and improve access to the British Library collection of Gulf records and Arab scientific manuscripts.
 Imperial College London Diabetes Centre / Mubadala Healthcare: A partnership aimed at diabetes treatment.

Additionally, Williams F1 was based at the Qatar Science & Technology Park (QSTP) for several years and the two organisations worked on a number of initiatives, including the promotion of road safety campaigns in Qatar.

Sport

UK Prime Minister David Cameron pledged the UK's support and previous experience from hosting international sporting events to Qatar and its 2022 FIFA World Cup project at a meeting with the Emir of Qatar in October 2014.

Qatar's winning bid was advised by Mike Lee and his communications agency Vero, the same figures behind both London and Rio de Janeiro’s winning Olympics bids in 2012 and 2016 respectively.

Major UK-based construction and architecture firms have won major contracts to prepare Qatar for the 2022 event. Foster and Partners won a contract to design the main stadium that will host the opening and closing ceremonies, while WS Atkins won a £70 million contract to coordinate current and planned road, rail, metro and other major infrastructure projects. Arup Associates was also tasked with designing a new carbon-efficient stadium.

Sheffield F.C., the UK's oldest football club, announced that Qatar had invested £100,000 in the club in September 2015.

Arts and culture

In 2013, Qatar and the UK instigated the Qatar-UK Year of Culture, a year-long programme of cultural exchange between the two countries. In partnership with the Victoria and Albert Museum and Qatar Museums Authority, numerous art exhibitions were launched including one of the biggest Damien Hirst exhibitions to date in Doha between October 2013 and January 2014.

The British Council has been involved in Qatar since 1972, working in arts, education and social programmes.

FIFA 2022
The UK and other countries have criticised Qatar for the way it treats women, homosexuals and foreigners. It was reported that the UK will be sending British police officers to Qatar during the World cup. They will assist their Qatari counterparts during the games.

References

External links
Qatar embassy in UK
British embassy in Qatar
Qatar Digital Library - an online portal providing access to British Library archive materials relating to Gulf history and Arabic science

 
United Kingdom
Qatar
Relations of colonizer and former colony